Cephems are a sub-group of β-lactam antibiotics including cephalosporins and cephamycins. It is one of the most common 4-membered ring heterocycle. Produced by actinomycetes, cephamycins were found to display antibacterial activity against a wide range of bacteria, including those resistant to penicillin and cephalosporins. The antimicrobial properties of Cephem include the attachment to certain penicillin-binding proteins that are involved in the production of cell walls of bacteria.

Research 
Researchers have developed antibiotics that include cephems and they have tried to test them clinically.  Many of the antibiotics that are manufactured have different efficiencies based on the amount used, their strength, and their antibacterial spectra. Research was conducted on drugs that contain cephem to investigate their pharmacokinetics in the exudate of the space behind the peritoneum after radical hysterectomy and pelvic lymphadenectomy.

References

Further reading

Beta-lactam antibiotics